Glasgow National Hockey Centre is a facility for playing field hockey, situated on Glasgow Green in Glasgow, United Kingdom. The facility was constructed for the Commonwealth Games in 2014. The facility includes 2 Synthetic Hockey Pitches, Player Facilities and a Permanent stand for spectators. It also has office space which is the new home of Scottish Hockey. For the 2014 Games, additional temporary stands were erected to increase the capacity during the games. The facility is used for domestic competition and hosted the 2014 Women's Hockey Champions Challenge I before the Commonwealth Games.
 The centre is also home of Rottenrow Hockey Club

References

External links

2014 Commonwealth Games venues
Sports venues in Glasgow
Field hockey venues in Scotland
Sports venues completed in 2013
Glasgow Green
2013 establishments in Scotland